Gustave Mark Gilbert (September 30, 1911 – February 6, 1977) was an American psychologist best known for his writings containing observations of high-ranking Nazi leaders during the Nuremberg trials. His 1950 book The Psychology of Dictatorship was an attempt to profile the Nazi German dictator Adolf Hitler using as reference the testimonials of Hitler's closest generals and commanders. Gilbert's published work is still a subject of study in many universities and colleges, especially in the field of psychology.

Early life and education
Gilbert was born in the state of New York in 1911, the son of Jewish-Austrian immigrants. He won a scholarship from the School for Ethical Culture at the College Town Center in New York. He attended the City College of New York where he majored in German before switching to psychology. In 1939, Gilbert obtained his PhD degree in psychology from Columbia University. Gilbert also held a diploma from the American Board of Examiners in professional psychology.

During World War II, Gilbert was commissioned with the rank of First Lieutenant. Because of his knowledge of German, he was sent overseas as a translator.

Nuremberg trials
In 1945, after the end of the war, Gilbert was sent to Nuremberg, Germany, as a translator for the International Military Tribunal for the trials of the World War II German prisoners. Gilbert was appointed the prison psychologist of the German prisoners. During the process of the trials Gilbert became, after Douglas Kelley, the confidant of Hermann Göring, Joachim von Ribbentrop, Wilhelm Keitel, Hans Frank, Oswald Pohl, Otto Ohlendorf, Rudolf Höss, and Ernst Kaltenbrunner, among others. Gilbert and Kelley administered the Rorschach inkblot test to the 22 defendants in the Nazi leadership group prior to the first set of trials. Gilbert also participated in the Nuremberg trials as the American Military Chief Psychologist and provided testimony attesting to the sanity of Rudolf Hess.

In 1946, after the trials, Gilbert returned to the US. Gilbert stayed busy teaching, researching, and writing. In 1947 he published part of his diary, consisting of observations taken during interviews, interrogations, "eavesdropping" and conversations with German prisoners, under the title Nuremberg Diary. (This diary was reprinted in full in 1961 just before the trial of Adolf Eichmann in Jerusalem.) 

The following is a famous exchange Gilbert had with Göring from this book:

Later life
In 1948, as Head Psychologist at the Veterans Hospital at Lyons, NJ, Gilbert treated veterans of World Wars I and II who had suffered nervous breakdowns.

In 1950, Gilbert published The Psychology of Dictatorship: Based on an Examination of the Leaders of Nazi Germany. In this book, Gilbert made an attempt to portray a profile of the psychological behavior of Adolf Hitler, based on deductive work from eyewitness reports from Hitler's commanders in prison in Nuremberg.

In September 1954, while he was an Associate Professor of Psychology at Michigan State College, Gilbert attended the 62nd Annual Convention of the American Psychological Association in New York. Gilbert was part of a four-person panel discussing "Psychological Approaches to the Problem of Anti-Intellectualism."

In 1961, when he was the chairman of the psychology department of Long Island University in Brooklyn, Gilbert was summoned to testify in the trial of Adolf Eichmann in Jerusalem. Gilbert testified on May 29, 1961, describing how both Ernst Kaltenbrunner and Rudolf Höss tried in their conversations with him to put the responsibility for the extermination of the Jews on each other's doorstep. Nevertheless, Eichmann appeared in the accounts of both men. Then he presented a document, handwritten by Höss, that surveys the process of extermination at Auschwitz and different sums of people gassed there – under Höss as commandant and according to an oral report by Eichmann. The court decided not to accept Gilbert's psychological analyses of the prisoners at Nuremberg as part of his testimony.

In 1967, Gilbert convinced Leon Pomeroy, then a recent graduate from University of Texas at Austin, to build a clinical doctoral program in the field of psychology at Long Island University. At the time, Gilbert was serving as chairman of the psychology department of Long Island University in Brooklyn, New York.

Gilbert died on 6 February 1977.

Portrayal in popular culture
Gustave Gilbert has been portrayed by the following actors in film, television and theater productions;
Jan Englert in the 1970 Polish film Epilog norymberski
Matt Craven in the 2000 Canadian/US TV production Nuremberg
August Zirner in the 2005 German docudrama  Speer und Er
Robert Jezek in the 2006 British television production Nuremberg: Goering's Last Stand
Adam Godley in the 2006 British television docudrama Nuremberg: Nazis on Trial
Also, the character "Abe Fields" in Michael Koehlmeier's 2008 book Abendland ("Occident") who is based on Gustave Gilbert (see the interview with the author  in the Austrian paper Der Falter of 15. 8. 2007). In the book, Abe Fields sits in on the trials as psychologist and speaks to the defendants.

Selected works
(1947). Nuremberg Diary. Farrar, Straus and Company: New York.
(1948). "Hermann Göring: Amiable Psychopath". Journal of Abnormal and Social Psychology, 43, 211–229.
(1950). The Psychology of Dictatorship: Based on an Examination of the Leaders of Nazi Germany. New York: The Ronald Press Company.
(1951). "Stereotype persistence and change among college students". Journal of Abnormal and Social Psychology, 46, 245–254.

See also
 Leon Goldensohn

References

Citations

Sources

Further reading

External links
https://web.archive.org/web/20060622002149/http://alumni.princeton.edu/~class51/mar48.html
http://www.acad.carleton.edu/curricular/PSYC/classes/psych383_Lutsky/P383.htm
http://www.bgu.ac.il/~danbaron/Docs_Dan/genocidal%20mentalities.doc
https://web.archive.org/web/20010405182851/http://www.e-valuemetrics.com/resume.htm#educational
http://www.ninehundred.net/control/mc-ch6.html
https://web.archive.org/web/20070419194802/http://www.spssi.org/teach_cc_syllabi7.html
http://www.topographiedesterrors.de/opac/find.php?urG=%7C1&urS=goering,!hermann
http://www.users.muohio.edu/shermarc/p630lf1.shtml
Obituary from The New York Times (preview)

1911 births
1977 deaths
American people of Austrian-Jewish descent
20th-century American psychologists
Columbia University alumni
Long Island University faculty
Nuremberg trials
United States Army officers